Below is a list of mayors of Durban, South Africa. In 2000 Durban became the seat of the newly created eThekwini Metropolitan Municipality.

1854-1910 

 , 1854–1856
 Edward Snell, 1856, 1867–69
 Savery Pinsent, 1856–57, 1859
 A W Evans, 1857–58
 J R Goodricke, 1857–59
 William Hartley, 1859–60
 Alexander McArthur, 1860–63
 Hugh Gillespie, 1863–65
 John Hunt and R W Tyzack, 1865–66
 Arthur Harvey and John Miller, 1866–67
 William Field, 1869–70 
 J D Ballance, 1870 
 William Palmer, 1871–72 
 John Goodliffe, 1872–73 
 Edward Pickering, 1873–74, 1882–83 
 Richard Vause, 1870–71, 1874–75, 1878–79, 1883–85 
 B W Greenacre, 1875–76, 1889–92, 1897–98 
 William Arbuckle, 1876–78, 1880–82 
 H W Currie, 1879–80 
 J W Stranack, 1885–86 
 W E Robarts, 1886–87 
 T A O'Flaherty, R L Cunningham, 1887–88 
 J J Hillier, 1887–89
 A W Leuchars, 1892–93
 George Payne, 1893–95, 1896–97
 R Jameson, 1895–96
 John Nicol, 1897–1901
 Ernest Leslie Acutt, 1901–02
 J Ellis Brown, 1902–05
 C Henwood, 1905–09
 Walter Greenacre, 1909–10

1910-2000
 F C Hollander, 1910–13
 W Holmes, 1913–15
 J H Nicolson, 1915–18
 T Burman, 1918–20
 T Burman and Fleming Johnston, 1920–21
 Fleming Johnston, 1921–22
 W Gilbert, 1922–24
 T M Wadley, 1924–26
 H L Buzzard, 1926–28
 A Eaton, 1928–29
 The Revd Archibald Lamont, 1929–32
 Oliver Lea, 1932–33
 Percy Osborn, 1933–34
 Dr S Copley, 1934–35
 Fleming Johnston, 1935–39
 R Ellis Brown, 1939–45, 1946–47
 S J Smith, 1945–46
 Leo Boyd, 1947–49
 Ken Clarke, 1949–50
 Percy Osborn, 1950–54
 R A Carte, 1954–55
 G Vernon Essery, 1955–56
 Percy Osborn, 1956–57
 H W Jackson, 1957–58
 W E Shaw, 1958–59
 C A Milne, 1959–64
 Dr Vernon Shearer, 1964–66
 Margaret Maytom
 T M Warman, 1968–70
 R Goldman, 1970–72
 Ron Williams, 1972–74
 A D Adams, 1974–76
 Dr G J Hollis, 1976–78
 Haydn Bradfield, 1978–80
 Mrs Sybil C Hotz, 1980–84
 Neil MacLennan, 1984–85
 Stanley H Lange, 1985–87
 Henry P Klotz, 1987–88
 D W Watterson, 1988–90
 J A Venter and G J Müller, 1990–92
 Margaret Winter, 1992–93
 Mike Lipschitz, 1993–96 
 Obed Mlaba, 1996–2011

Since 2000 (eThekwini Municipality)
 Obed Mlaba, 1996–2011
 James Nxumalo, 2011–2016 
 Zandile Gumede, 2016–2019
 Mxolisi Kaunda, 2019–present

See also
 Timeline of Durban
 Metropolitan municipality (South Africa)

References

External links
 

Durban
Mayors